Kuddigam is a village in Kotturu mandal, located in Srikakulam district of Andhra Pradesh, India.

References

Villages in Srikakulam district